Tosh is a surname, and may refer to:

 Andrew Tosh (born 1967), reggae singer and the son of the late Peter Tosh
 Daniel Tosh (born 1975), stand-up comedian and TV host of the show Tosh.0
 Donald Tosh (1935–2019), BBC screenwriter 
 Dwight Tosh (born 1948), American politician
 George Tosh (1813–1900), Scottish engineer and metallurgist
 James Ramsay Tosh FRSE (1872-1917) Scottish marine zoologist
 John Tosh, British historian and Professor of History at Roehampton University
 Murray Tosh (born 1950), Scottish Conservative and Unionist politician
 Paul Tosh (born 1973), Scottish association football player
 Peter Tosh (1944–1987), Jamaican reggae musician and core member of the band The Wailers
 Steve Tosh (born 1973), professional association footballer
 Stuart Tosh (born 1951), drummer, songwriter and vocalist